Merita Berntsen (born 24 February 1969) is a Norwegian beach volleyball player, born in Bergen. She competed in the women's tournament at the 1996 Summer Olympics in Atlanta, with teammate Ragni Hestad.

References

External links

1969 births
Living people
Sportspeople from Bergen
Norwegian beach volleyball players
Olympic beach volleyball players of Norway
Beach volleyball players at the 1996 Summer Olympics